Traveller Supplement 6: 76 Patrons is a 1980 role-playing game supplement for Traveller published by Game Designers' Workshop.

Contents
76 Patrons provides 76 impromptu non-player character patrons, each with a mission of varying degrees of difficulty for player characters.

Reception
William A. Barton reviewed 76 Patrons in The Space Gamer No. 36. Barton commented that "even if the referee finds it necessary to a lot of tinkering with the scenarios as presented, 76 Patrons should prove a useful addition to the Traveller referee's tools-of-the-trade in creating interesting role-playing encounters."

Reviews
 Different Worlds #22 (July, 1982)

References

Role-playing game supplements introduced in 1980
Traveller (role-playing game) supplements